The Kochi International Marina is a marina in the city of Kochi, in the state of Kerala, India. It is located in the eastern coast of the Mulavukad (one of the islands part of the city of Kochi), in the premises of the Bolgatty Palace, a 'heritage hotel'.

The Kochi International Marina is the only international marina in India. It is owned by the Kerala Tourism Development Corporation. The marina provides berthing facility for yachts and also offers services like fuel, water, electricity and sewage pump-outs for boats. The marina is close to the international maritime route at the southwest coast of the Indian Peninsula, with favourable conditions and minimum tidal variations throughout the year.

General description 

The Kochi International Marina started operations on 24 April 2010. It is the first full-fledged marina of international standards in India.

The Marina is owned and operated by KTDC. It was implemented by KITCO (Formerly Kerala Industrial and Technical Consultancy Organisation) for and on behalf of KTDC. Sharjah’s Hamriyah Free Zone-based Gulf Marinas did the construction under the supervision of KITCO. The Marina is owned and managed by Kerala Tourism Development Corporation.

The Kochi Marina houses facility for berthing around 34 yachts. This will be further upgraded to 50 berths. Construction of a three-storey building on the north-eastern side of the KTDC Bolgatty Palace hotel to accommodate sailors from across the world is complete. KTDC had spent Rs 8.21 crore on Phase -1 of the project with a central assistance of Rs 4 crore. A two-lane road connecting the main land with the island is also ready. Repair and maintenance facilities for the yachts also available at the Marina.

Kochi is an ideal berthing spot for yachts from the West, crossing Suez Canal and travelling towards the north eastern parts of Asia. Currently, there are no intermediate berthing facilities for yachts leaving Dubai until they reach their destinations in the Far East. Situated just 11 nautical miles from the international maritime route, Kochi has one of the best natural ports in Asia where Dubai Ports World is building an international container transshipment terminal. 

Kochi recently became a touching place of Luxury cruise lines. During the last one decade, Kochi had become a major destination for sea-based adventure tourism. On an average 100 yachts visit Kochi every year of which majority is from European countries such as the United Kingdom, Finland and Norway apart from New Zealand and Australia. The Cochin Port Trust is also building a cruise terminal on the nearby Willington Island. Since Kochi is the nearest port on the international maritime route between the west and the east more adventurous seafarers prefer this port.

Facilities 
The marina will have facilities to repair yachts and for filling fuel and food items. Facilities like golf course, swimming pool, spa, health club, restaurant and beer parlour will also be provided for the sailors.

Floating docks built on concrete beams is the major attraction of the project. A board walk - wooden structure protruding into the back waters in order to facilitate other tourists to see the yachts has also been arranged.

Additional 16 docks would be added in the next phase and additional facilities would be provided on 2 acres of reclaimed land adjacent to the island.

Marina House

Marina House, built in the traditional Kerala architectural style, is an essential part of Kochi International Marina that serves as a station for vessels to refuel and to replenish their stores. Besides, the Marina House also provides 24 deluxe rooms including 4 suite rooms, a recreation centre and cafeteria, is also managed by KTDC.

See also
 List of marinas
 List of Tourist attractions in Kochi

References

Tourist attractions in Kochi
Marinas in India
Water transport in Kerala
Transport in Kochi
Buildings and structures in Kochi
2013 establishments in Kerala